The Kezar River is a  tributary of the Old Course Saco River in western Maine in the United States. It starts at the outlet of Five Kezar Ponds in the town of Lovell, drops over Kezar Falls, and flows southwest, briefly entering the town of Sweden before reentering Lovell and passing that town's central village.

See also
List of rivers of Maine

References

Maine Streamflow Data from the USGS
Maine Watershed Data From Environmental Protection Agency

Saco River
Rivers of Oxford County, Maine
Fryeburg, Maine
Rivers of Maine